Cliffhangers is an American drama television series that aired on NBC from February 27 to May 1, 1979. It attempted to revive the genre of movie serials in a television format. Each hour-long episode was divided into three 20-minute segments, a mystery Stop Susan Williams, a science fiction/western hybrid The Secret Empire and a horror story, The Curse of Dracula.

Series overview
 Stop Susan Williams was a take-off of the old serial The Perils of Pauline. It starred Susan Anton as globetrotting newspaper photographer Susan Willaims, who is investigating the mysterious death of her brother Alan, and stumbles across a vast international conspiracy. 
 The Secret Empire was a pastiche of the Gene Autry movie serial The Phantom Empire, detailing the 1880s Wild West adventures of Marshal Jim Donner (Geoffrey Scott) who stumbles upon the futuristic underground city of Chimera, which is run by aliens. Scenes on the surface were sepia-toned, while the scenes in Chimera were shown in color.
 The Curse of Dracula revolved around a young woman's quest to avenge her mother against Count Dracula (Michael Nouri), who is living undercover as a college teacher in San Francisco. 

To add to the "in-progress" feeling of the proceedings, all three series started with different chapter numbers (although this was the first broadcast for all of them). "Stop Susan Williams" began at Chapter II, "The Secret Empire" started with Chapter III, and "The Curse of Dracula" with Chapter VI. 

Cliffhangers was an expensive production due to three simultaneous production units being required. The hope was that if one of the serials caught on, it could be spun off into its own series, however the show aired opposite Happy Days and Laverne & Shirley, the #1 and #2 most popular shows in television at the time. The show was cancelled after only 10 episodes had aired, by which point only The Curse of Dracula had reached its conclusion. However, one unaired episode (which did air overseas) featured the two concluding chapters of The Secret Empire as well as the final part of Stop Susan Williams. American viewers later got a chance to see the concluding part of Stop Susan Williams when its eleven installments were re-edited into a single two-hour television movie The Girl Who Saved the World. Curse of Dracula was also re-edited as two television movies, Dracula '79 and World of Dracula.

Cast and characters
Stop Susan Williams
 Susan Anton as Susan Williams
 Ray Walston as Bob Richards
 Marj Dusat as Jennifer Selden ( 2–11)
 Michael Swan as Jack Schoengarth
 and Albert Paulsen as Anthony Korf ( 2–11)
The Secret Empire
 Geoffrey Scott as Marshal Jim Donner
 Carlene Watkins as Millie Thomas
 David Opatoshu as Hator ( 3–5, 7–11)
 Mark Lenard as Emperor Thorval
 Diane Markoff as Princess Tara
The Curse of Dracula
 Michael Nouri as Count Dracula
 Carol Baxter as Mary Gibbons
 Stephen Johnson as Kurt Von Helsing
 Bever-Leigh Banfield as Christine
 Louise Sorel as Amanda Gibbons ( 5–10)

Episodes

See also
Vampire films
List of vampire films
List of vampire television series

References

External links
IMDB:

Epguides:

1979 American television series debuts
1979 American television series endings
Television series set in 1979
1970s American drama television series
Dracula television shows
English-language television shows
Television series by Universal Television
NBC original programming
Television shows set in Chicago